Thomas Adrian Sands (born August 27, 1937) is an American pop music singer and actor. Working in show business as a child, Sands became an overnight sensation and instant teen idol when he appeared on Kraft Television Theater in January 1957 as "The Singin' Idol". The song from the show, "Teen-Age Crush", reached No. 2 on the Billboard Hot 100 and No. 1 on Cashbox.

Early life
Sands was born into a musical family in Chicago, Illinois; his father, Ben, was a pianist, and his mother, Grace, a big-band singer. He moved with the family to Shreveport, Louisiana. He began playing the guitar at eight and within a year had a job performing twice weekly on a local radio station. At the beginning of his teen years, he moved to Houston, Texas, where he attended Lamar High School and joined a band with "Jimmie Lee Durden and the Junior Cowboys", consisting of Sands, Durden, and Billy Reno. They performed on radio, at county fairs, and did personal appearances. He was only 15 when Colonel Tom Parker heard about him and signed him to RCA Records.

Career

The Singin' Idol
Sands's initial recordings achieved little in the way of sales but in early 1957 he was given the opportunity to star in an episode of Kraft Television Theatre called "The Singing Idol". He played the part of a singer who was very similar to Elvis Presley, with guitar, pompadour hair, and excitable teenage fans.

On the show, his song presentation of a Joe Allison composition called "Teen-Age Crush" went over big with the young audience and, released as a single by Capitol Records, it went to No. 2 on the Billboard Hot 100 record chart and No. 1 on the Cashbox chart. It became a gold record.

His track, "The Old Oaken Bucket", peaked at No. 25 on the UK Singles Chart in 1960.

He released his debut album Steady Date with Tommy Sands (1957).

Sands' sudden fame brought an offer to sing at the Academy Awards show. He did another episode of Kraft Television Theatre, "Flesh and Blood" (1957), playing the son of a gangster. He also made "The Promise" for Zane Grey Theatre (1957), playing the son of a character played by Gary Merrill.

20th Century Fox
Sands' teen idol looks landed him a motion-picture contract with 20th Century Fox to star in a 1958 musical drama called Sing, Boy, Sing, the feature film version of "The Singin' Idol". Fox had enjoyed success with films starring other teen idols such as Elvis Presley and Pat Boone but Sing, Boy, Sing was a financial failure.

Sands appeared on CBS Television on January 9, 1958 in an episode of Shower of Stars, and played another singing star in "The Left-handed Welcome" for Studio One in Hollywood (1958).

Sands supported Pat Boone in a musical for Fox, Mardi Gras (1958), which was a moderate hit. He also released the albums Sands Storm (1958), This Thing Called Love (1959), and When I'm Thinking of You (1959).

Sands appeared in the 1960 episode of Wagon Train titled "The Larry Hanify Story", and also a later Wagon Train''' episode in 1963, "The Gus Morgan Story".  His later albums included Sands at the Sands (1960) and Dream with Me (1960). From May to November 1960, he served in the United States Air Force Reserves.

Later films
Sands' second lead role in a feature was in the teen comedy Love in a Goldfish Bowl (1961) with Fabian Forte, which was not a success. More popular was a fantasy musical he made at Disney, Babes in Toyland (1961), co-starring Annette Funicello. That year he and Funicello sang the Sherman Brothers' title song from the Walt Disney release of The Parent Trap.

Sands guested starred on "The Inner Panic" for The United States Steel Hour and was one of several pop stars who played US Rangers in Fox's The Longest Day (1962).

Sands had married Nancy Sinatra whose father Frank offered Sands a role in Come Blow Your Horn but he turned it down. Sands studied acting in New York.

Sands appeared alongside Fred Astaire in "Blow High, Blow Clear" for Alcoa Theatre (1963). On May 14, 1963, Sands appeared, along with Claude Akins and Jim Davis, in "Trapped", one of the last episodes of NBC's Laramie western series. In the story line, series character Slim Sherman (John Smith) finds an injured kidnap victim in the woods, portrayed by Joan Freeman. Dennis Holmes, as series regular Mike Williams, rides away to seek help, but the kidnappers reclaim the hostage. Slim pursues the kidnappers but is mistaken as a third kidnapper by the girl's father, played by Barton MacLane. Sands played the girl's boyfriend, who had been ordered by her father to stop seeing her.

Later in 1963, Sands made several appearances on Wagon Train including "The Davey Baxter Story", "The Larry Hanify Story," "The Gus Morgan Story" (with Peter Falk), and "The Bob Stuart Story".

Sands had a support role in the feature film Ensign Pulver (1964) at Warners. He guest starred on Slattery's People ("Question: Why the Lonely?... Why the Misbegotten?") and had a support role in the war feature None But the Brave (1965), starring and directed by Frank Sinatra.

Sands guest starred on Kraft Suspense Theatre ("A Lion Amongst Men", which earned him good reviews), Combat! ("More Than a Soldier"), Valentine's Day ("For Me and My Sal"), Mr Novak ("Let's Dig a Little Grammar", "And Then I Wrote..."), Branded ("That the Brave Endure"), Bonanza ("The Debt"), and Hawaii Five-O ("No Blue Skies").

Career decline
Sands divorced Nancy Sinatra in 1965.  "The doors to Hollywood seemed to slam shut after the divorce from Nancy", he said. "I couldn't get acting roles, my singing career on TV and in films was over."

His last feature to date was The Violent Ones (1967) in which Sands had a supporting role. He moved to Hawaii in 1967. 

Hawaii
In Hawaii, Sands operated the Tommy Sands Nightclub Tour for five years, and performed at the Outrigger Hotel in Waikiki. His later appearances included episodes of Hawaii Five-O ("No Blue Skies", "Hit Gun for Sale", "A Sentence to Steal"), and The Hardy Boys/Nancy Drew Mysteries ("Mystery on the Avalanche Express"). He occasionally returned to the mainland to work, appearing in dinner theatre.

Sands returned permanently to the mainland of the US in 1981, settling in Fort Wayne, Indiana. He toured regularly performing concerts.

Personal life

Tommy Sands and singer Nancy Sinatra married in 1960 and divorced in 1965. His career had declined significantly by 1965, triggering speculation that Frank Sinatra had him "blacklisted" in the entertainment industry after their divorce. Such reports were denied by both Sands and Sinatra. In 1974, Sands married Sheila Wallace, a secretary, in Honolulu, where he had relocated in a vain attempt to revive his career.

Filmography
Film

Television

Discography
US singles discography
 Love Pains / Transfer – RCA 1953
 Life Is So Lonesome / A Dime and a Dollar – RCA 1954
 Don't Drop It / A Place For Girls Like You – RCA 1954
 Something's Bound To Go Wrong / Kissin' Ain't No Fun – RCA 1955
 Teen-Age Crush / Hep Dee Hootie (Cutie Wootie) – Capitol 1957 (U.S. No. 2, 2 wks.; No. 10 R&B; Cashbox #1)
 My Love Song / Ring-A-Ding-Ding – Capitol 1957 No. 62 U.S. A-Side, No. 50 U.S. B-Side
 Love Paris / Don't Drop It – RCA 1957
 Goin' Steady / Ring My Phone – Capitol 1957 No. 16 U.S.
 Let Me Loved / Fantastically Foolish – Capitol 1957
 Man, Like Wow! / A Swingin' Romance – Capitol 1957
 Sing Boy Sing / Crazy 'Cause I Love You – Capitol 1957 No. 24 U.S.
 Teen-Age Doll / Hawaiian Rock – Capitol 1958 No. 81 U.S.
 After The Senior Prom / Big Date – Capitol 1958
 Blue Ribbon Baby / I Love You Because – Capitol 1958 No. 50 U.S.
 The Worryin' Kind/Bigger Than Texas – 1958 No. 69 U.S.
 Is It Ever Gonna Happen / I Ain't Gittin' Rid of You – Capitol 1959
 Sinner Man / Bring Me Your Love – Capitol 1959
 I'll Be Seeing You / That's The Way I Am – Capitol 1959 No. 51 U.S.
 You Hold The Future / I Gotta Have You –  Capitol 1959
 That's Love / Crossroads – Capitol 1960
 The Old Oaken Bucket / These Are The Things You Are – Capitol 1960 No. 73 U.S. No. 25 U.K.
 On And On / Doctor Heartache – Capitol 1960
 The Parent Trap / Let's Get Together – Buena Vista 1961 (Annette Funicello And Tommy Sands)
 I Love My Baby / Love in a Goldfish Bowl – Capitol 1961
 Remember Me (To Jennie) / Rainbow – Capitol 1961
 Jimmy's Song / Wrong Side of Love – Capitol 1961
 A Young Man's Fancy / Connie – ABC-Paramount 1963
 Only Cause I'm Lonely / Cinderella – ABC-Paramount 1963
 Ten Dollars and a Clean White Shirt / Won't You Be My Girl – ABC-Paramount 1964
 Kisses (Love Theme) / Something More – ABC-Paramount 1964
 Love's Funny / One Rose Today, One Rose Tomorrow – Liberty 1965
 The Statue / Little Rosita – Liberty 1965
 It's The Only One I've Got / As Long As I'm Travellin'- Imperial 1966
 Candy Store Prophet / Second Star to the Left – Imperial 1967
 Seasons in the Sun / Ain't No Big Thing – Superscope 1969

U.S. LP discography
 Steady Date with Tommy Sands, Capitol 848, 1957
 Sing Boy Sing, Capitol 929, 1958
 Sands Storm, Capitol 1081, 1958
 This Thing Called Love, Capitol 1123, 1959
 When I'm Thinking of You, Capitol 1239, 1959
 Sands at the Sands, Capitol 1364, 1960 (live)
 Dream with Me, Capitol 1426, 1960
 Babes in Toy Land, Buena Vista 3913/4022, 1961 (soundtrack)
 The Parent Trap, Vista 3309, 1961 (soundtrack)
 Seasons in the Sun'', Superscope 3A009, 1969

References

External links

Official Tommy Sands Web Site
Tommy Sands at Rockabilly Hall of Fame
Interview with Tommy Sands
Tommy Sands Interview at Elvis2001.net

1937 births
Living people
American male pop singers
American male film actors
American male television actors
Male actors from Chicago
Musicians from Shreveport, Louisiana
RCA Victor artists
Capitol Records artists
Disney people
Liberty Records artists
Singers from Los Angeles
ABC Records artists
Male actors from Los Angeles
Actors from Shreveport, Louisiana
Singers from Louisiana
American rockabilly musicians